Barrie Youngfellow Freed (born Barrie Sarah Rivchun; October 22, 1946 – March 28, 2022) was an American actress. She was the wife of stage and screen actor Sam Freed.

Career
Youngfellow began her career in the early 1970s in a small role in a 1973 episode of The New Temperatures Rising Show. She went on to appear as a guest in episodes of numerous American TV shows of the 1970s and 80s, including Emergency!, The Streets of San Francisco, Fernwood 2 Night, WKRP in Cincinnati, Barney Miller, The Jeffersons and Three's Company. She also starred in numerous films and made-for-TV movies including Nightmare in Blood (1978), Vampire (1979), It Came Upon the Midnight Clear (1984), The Lady from Yesterday (1985) and Moviola: The Scarlett O'Hara War (1980) in which she portrayed Joan Crawford.

Youngfellow is best known for her role as sharp-tongued and sarcastic waitress Jan Hoffmeyer Gray on the sitcom It's a Living from 198082 on ABC and 198589 in first-run syndication. She and Gail Edwards, Paul Kreppel and Marian Mercer were the only actors from It's a Living to last all the way through the show's network and syndication runs. In 1990, It's a Living producers Paul Junger Witt and Tony Thomas cast Youngfellow in the pilot episode of Blossom, in which she played the mother of Mayim Bialik's title character; she did not continue with the project when NBC picked it up as a regular series. In 1998, she made her last TV appearance, in an episode of Law & Order.

Personal life
She married stage and screen actor Sam Freed in 1983. The two narrated the 2001 audiobook of The Children's Book of Faith by William J. Bennett. Youngfellow was formerly married to Michael Mund Youngfellow from 1968 to 1975.

, she was president of the California corporation To Be Announced, Inc. (founded November 20, 1978).

Death
Youngfellow lived in Woodstock, New York, from 1989. She died on March 28, 2022, at the age of 75.

References

External links 

1946 births
2022 deaths
Actresses from Cleveland
American film actresses
American television actresses
American voice actresses
People from Woodstock, New York
20th-century American actresses
21st-century American women